Christian Sauter (born 11 February 1988) is a German professional footballer who plays as a midfielder.

Career
Sauter has played for VfB Stuttgart II, SSV Reutlingen 05, SSV Ulm 1846 and 1. FC Heidenheim.

References

External links
Christian Sauter at Kicker

1988 births
Living people
German footballers
Germany youth international footballers
3. Liga players
Regionalliga players
VfB Stuttgart II players
SSV Ulm 1846 players
SSV Reutlingen 05 players
1. FC Heidenheim players
1. FC Saarbrücken players
Association football midfielders